Gordon North is a suburb of Port Moresby, the capital city of Papua New Guinea. It is a residential suburb adjacent to The Australian High Commission.

Suburbs of Port Moresby